Oscar Ayodi (born September 21, 1989) is a Kenyan rugby sevens player. He was also part of the team that won the 2016 Singapore Sevens, Kenya's first tournament victory. He shared the DHL Impact Player award at the Singapore Sevens with Kitione Taliga of Fiji.

References

External links 
 
 
 
 Oscar Ayodi at ShujaaPride.com

1989 births
Living people
Rugby sevens players at the 2016 Summer Olympics
Olympic rugby sevens players of Kenya
Kenya international rugby sevens players
Male rugby sevens players
Kenyan rugby union players